The protected areas of North Carolina cover roughly 3.8 million acres, making up 11% of the total land in the state. 86.5% of this protected land is publicly owned and is managed by different federal and state level authorities and receive varying levels of protection. Some areas are managed as wilderness while others are operated with acceptable commercial exploitation.  The remainder of the land is privately owned, but willingly entered into conservation easement management agreements, or are owned by various nonprofit conservation groups such as the National Audubon Society and The Nature Conservancy.  North Carolina contains 1 National Park, and various other federally owned protected land including 2 National Seashores, 5 National Forests, 12 Wildlife Refuges, and the southern half of the Blue Ridge Parkway. North Carolina has an extensive state park system of 42 open units, 35 of which are state parks, 4 that are recreation areas, and 3 staffed state natural areas, along with other designated units managed by the North Carolina Department of Natural and Cultural Resources.

Federal-level protection agencies

North Carolina's federally protected areas are managed by agencies within the United States Department of the Interior.  The agencies which govern nationally protected places in North Carolina are the National Park Service; the U.S. Forest Service; the Bureau of Land Management; and the United States Fish and Wildlife Service.

National Parks
Great Smoky Mountains National Park

National Historic Sites
Carl Sandburg Home National Historic Site
Fort Raleigh National Historic Site

National Memorials

Wright Brothers National Memorial

National Military Parks
Guilford Courthouse National Military Park

National Battlefields
Moores Creek National Battlefield

National Parkways

Blue Ridge Parkway
Crabtree Falls
Cumberland Knob
Doughton Park
E.B. Jeffress Park
Julian Price Memorial Park
Linville Falls
Moses H. Cone Memorial Park
Mount Pisgah
Waterrock Knob

National Trails System
Appalachian Trail
Overmountain Victory National Historic Trail

National Seashores

Cape Hatteras National Seashore
Cape Lookout National Seashore

National Marine Sanctuary
Monitor National Marine Sanctuary

National Estuarine Research Reserve
Currituck Banks
Rachel Carson
Masonboro Island
Zeke's Island

National Forests

Cherokee National Forest
Croatan National Forest
Nantahala National Forest
Pisgah National Forest
Uwharrie National Forest

National Wildlife Refuges

Alligator River National Wildlife Refuge
Cedar Island National Wildlife Refuge
Currituck National Wildlife Refuge
Great Dismal Swamp National Wildlife Refuge
Mackay Island National Wildlife Refuge
Mattamuskeet National Wildlife Refuge
Mountain Bogs National Wildlife Refuge
Pea Island National Wildlife Refuge
Pee Dee National Wildlife Refuge
Pocosin Lakes National Wildlife Refuge
Roanoke River National Wildlife Refuge
Swanquarter National Wildlife Refuge

National Wilderness

Birkhead Mountains Wilderness
Catfish Lake South Wilderness
Ellicott Rock Wilderness
Joyce Kilmer-Slickrock Wilderness
Linville Gorge Wilderness
Middle Prong Wilderness
Pocosin Wilderness
Pond Pine Wilderness
Sheep Ridge Wilderness
Shining Rock Wilderness
Southern Nantahala Wilderness
Swanquarter Wilderness

Wilderness Study Areas
Craggy Mountain Wilderness Study Area
Harper Creek Wilderness Study Area
Lost Cove Wilderness Study Area
Overflow Wilderness Study Area
Snowbird Wilderness Study Area

National Wild and Scenic Rivers

Chatooga River
Horsepasture River
Lumber River
New River
Wilson Creek

State-level protection agencies

Out of North Carolina's protected land, 250,000 acres of land and water is managed by the North Carolina Department of Natural and Cultural Resources.  These areas include State Parks, State Recreation Areas, State Natural Areas, State Lakes, State Trails, State Rivers, State Forests, Educational State Forests, State Historic Sites, and NC Coastal Reserves.

State Parks

Carolina Beach State Park
Carvers Creek State Park
Chimney Rock State Park
Cliffs of the Neuse State Park
Crowders Mountain State Park
Dismal Swamp State Park
Elk Knob State Park
Eno River State Park
Fort Macon State Park
Goose Creek State Park
Gorges State Park
Grandfather Mountain
Hammocks Beach State Park
Hanging Rock State Park
Haw River State Park
Jockey's Ridge State Park
Jones Lake State Park
Lake James State Park
Lake Norman State Park
Lake Waccamaw State Park
Lumber River State Park
Mayo River State Park
Medoc Mountain State Park
Merchants Millpond State Park
Morrow Mountain State Park
Mount Mitchell State Park
New River State Park
Pettigrew State Park
Pilot Mountain State Park
Pisgah View State Park
Raven Rock State Park
Rendezvous Mountain State Park
Singletary Lake State Park
South Mountains State Park
Stone Mountain State Park
William B. Umstead State Park

State Recreation Areas
Falls Lake State Recreation Area
Fort Fisher State Recreation Area
Jordan Lake State Recreation Area
Kerr Lake State Recreation Area

State Natural Areas
Baldhead Island State Natural Area
Bay Tree State Natural Area
Bear Paw State Natural Area
Beech Creek Bog State Natural Area
Bobs Creek State Natural Area
Bullhead Mountain State Natural Area
Bushy Lake State Natural Area
Chowan Swamp State Natural Area
Hemlock Bluffs State Natural Area
Lea Island State Natural Area
Lower Haw River State Natural Area
Masonboro Island State Natural Area
Mitchells Millpond State Natural Area
Mount Jefferson State Natural Area
Occoneechee Mountain State Natural Area
Pineola Bog State Natural Area
Run Hill State Natural Area
Salmon Creek State Natural Area
Sandy Run Savannas State Natural Area
Sugar Mountain Bog State Natural Area
Theodore Roosevelt State Natural Area
Warwick Mill Bay State Natural Area
Weymouth Woods-Sandhills Nature Preserve
Yellow Mountain State Natural Area

State Lakes
Bay Tree Lake
Jones Lake
Lake Phelps
Salters Lake
Singletary Lake
Lake Waccamaw
White Lake

State Trails

Dan River Trail
Deep River State Trail
East Coast Greenway
American Tobacco Trail
Fonta Flora State Trail
French Broad River Trail
Hickory Nut Gorge State Trail
Mountains-to-Sea Trail
Northern Peaks State Trail
Wilderness Gateway State Trail
Yadkin River Trail

State Rivers
Horsepasture River
Linville River
Lumber River
New River

State Forests

Bladen Lakes State Forest
DuPont State Forest
Headwaters State Forest
Rendezvous Mountain State Forest

Educational State Forests
Clemmons Educational State Forest
Holmes Educational State Forest
Jordan Lake Educational State Forest
Mountain Island Educational State Forest
Turnbull Creek Educational State Forest
Tuttle Educational State Forest

State Historic Sites

Alamance Battleground
Aycock Birthplace
Historic Bath
Bennett Place
Bentonville Battlefield
Brunswick Town
Fort Anderson
CSS Neuse
Palmer Memorial Institute
Duke Homestead and Tobacco Factory
Edenton Historic District
Fort Dobbs
Fort Fisher
Halifax Historic District
Horne Creek Living Historical Farm
House in the Horseshoe
North Carolina Transportation Museum
President James K. Polk Historic Site
Reed Gold Mine
Somerset Place
Stagville
North Carolina State Capitol
Town Creek Indian Mound
Tryon Palace
Zebulon B. Vance Birthplace
Thomas Wolfe House

North Carolina Coastal Reserves
Kitty Hawk Woods North Carolina Coastal Reserve
Emily and Richardson Preyer Buckridge North Carolina Coastal Reserve
Buxton Woods North Carolina Coastal Reserve
Permuda Island
Bald Head Woods North Carolina Coastal Reserve
Bird Island

Other
List of nature centers in North Carolina

References

Protected areas of North Carolina